Liudmyla Dmitrievna Shmatko (born 25 October 1993) is a Ukrainian women's football defender currently playing in the Turkish Women's First Football League for Fomget Gençlik ve Spor with jersey number 35.

Playing career

Spartak Chernihiv & WFC Lehenda-ShVSM Chernihiv
Shmatko played in her country for Spartak ShVSM Chernihiv and WFC Lehenda-ShVSM Chernihiv in Chernihiv.With Lehenda he played 47 matches and she scored 22 goals and she got second places on Ukrainian Women's League in 2013 and 2015. She also got second place in Ukrainian Women's Cup in 2013, 2014, 2015, 2016 and 2017–18.

ALG Spor
In 2018, Shmatko moved to Turkey, and joined the recently to the Turkish Women's First League promoted club ALG Spor in Gaziantep.

Fomget Gençlik ve Spor
In the second half of the 2019–20 Turkish Women's First Football League season, she transferred to the Ankara-based club Fomget Gençlik ve Spor.

Coaching career
In 2022 she become the coach of Yunist ShVSM, the woman football club of the Yunist school in Chernihiv.

Career statistics
.

Honours 
Lehenda-ShVSM Chernihiv
 Ukrainian Women's League 
Runners-up 2013, 2015
 Ukrainian Women's Cup 
Runners-up 2013, 2014, 2015, 2016, 2017–18

Turkish Women's First League
 ALG Spor
Runners-up (1): 2018–19

References

External link

Living people
1993 births
Footballers from Chernihiv
Ukrainian women's footballers
Women's association football defenders
Expatriate women's footballers in Turkey
Ukrainian expatriate sportspeople in Turkey
Spartak ShVSM Chernihiv players
WFC Lehenda-ShVSM Chernihiv players
FC Yunist ShVSM managers
ALG Spor players